Indian Nepali, Indian Nepalese or Indo Nepalese are Nepalese (Nepali people) who have Indian heritage. The Marwadi people have lived in Nepal for several hundred years. They came to Nepal from Rajasthan as traders and flourished in Nepal where there was very little trade activity then. Now the Marwaris control majority of top businesses of Nepal. There are also a few Punjabis and Bengalis in major cities of Nepal. A plenty of Muslims have also immigrated from India to Nepal. A majority of them are involved in low profile works like rickshaw pullers, cobblers, tailors, scavengers etc. Some run small businesses also. In 2001, it was estimated that around 4 million Indians had migrated to Nepal over the previous 35 to 40 years while an estimated 7 million migrated from Nepal to India mostly for work.

See also
 Madheshi people
 Indo-Nepalese relations
 Nepali Indian
 1950 Indo-Nepal Treaty of Peace and Friendship

References

Indian
Nepal